Central Park is a pinball machine that was released by Gottlieb in 1966. The game was sold in 3,100 units. It was designed by Ed Krynski and the art was done by Roy Parker.

Gameplay
Central Park is a very difficult game due to the large gap between the flippers. The goal of the game is to raise a special called the Tree Bonus by collecting numbers. The player can collect numbers by hitting targets at the top of the playfield. Every time 100 points are scored in Central Park an animated monkey on the backglass will ring a bell. Hitting the 7 and 9 would light up a bumper, earning 10 points instead of the usual 1. The 2 and 4 would also light up a bumper.

Design team
 Concept: Ed Krynski
 Game Design: Ed Krynski
 Mechanics: Ed Krynski
 Artwork: Art Stenholm, Roy Parker
 Animation: Ed Krynski

Digital versions
Central Park is available as a licensed table of The Pinball Arcade for several platforms, and can be adjusted to have extra balls allowed or not, however the table is defaulted to five ball play. The table appeared also in Pinball Hall of Fame: The Gottlieb Collection on multiple video game consoles.

References

External links
 

1966 pinball machines
Gottlieb pinball machines